Mexico competed at the 1976 Summer Olympics in Montreal, Quebec, Canada. 97 competitors, 92 men and 5 women, took part in 54 events in 17 sports.

Medalists

Gold
 Daniel Bautista — Athletics, Men's 20 km Walk

Bronze
 Juan Paredes — Boxing, Men's Featherweight

Athletics

Men's 5.000 metres
 Rodolfo Gomez
 Heat — 13:46.23 (→ did not advance)

Men's 10.000 metres
 Luis Hernández
 Heat — 28:44.17 (→ did not advance)

 Rodolfo Gomez
 Heat — 30:05.19 (→ did not advance)

Men's Marathon
 Mario Cuevas — 2:18:08 (→ 18th place)
 Rodolfo Gomez — 2:18:21 (→ 19th place)

Men's 20 km Race Walk
 Daniel Bautista — 1:24:40 (→  Gold Medal)
 Raúl González — 1:28:18 (→ 5th place)
 Domingo Colin — DSQ (→ no ranking)

Basketball

Men's team competition
Preliminary round (group A):
 Lost to Soviet Union (77-120)
 Defeated Japan (108-90) 
 Lost to Australia (117-120) 
 Lost to Cuba (75-89) 
 Lost to Canada (84-92) 
Classification Match:
 9th/10th place: Lost to Puerto Rico (84-89) → 10th place

Team roster
Jesús García
Arturo Guerrero
Jorge Flores
Rafael Palomar
Antonio Ayala
Samuel Campis
Héctor Rodríguez
Anastacio Reyes
Gabriel Nava
Ruben Alcala
Manuel Saenz
Manuel Raga
Head coach: Carlos Bru

Boxing

Men's Flyweight (– 51 kg)
 Ernesto Rios
 First Round — Lost to Alfredo Pérez (VEN), 0:5

Men's Featherweight
Juan Paredes

Men's Middleweight
Nicolas Arredondo

Canoeing

Cycling

Six cyclists represented Mexico in 1976.

Individual road race
 Rubén Camacho — 4:54:49.0 (→ 45th place) 
 Luis Ramos — did not finish (→ no ranking) 
 José Castañeda — did not finish (→ no ranking) 
 Rodolfo Vitela — did not finish (→ no ranking)

Team time trial
 2:18:48 - 18th Place
Team roster
 José Castañeda
 Rodolfo Vitela
 Ceferino Estrada
 Francisco Huerta

Diving

Equestrian

Football

Gymnastics

Judo

Rowing

Sailing

Shooting

Swimming

Men's 200m Freestyle
Eduardo Pérez
Guillermo García

Men's 100m Backstroke
José Urueta
Ignacio Álvarez

Men's 200m Backstroke
José Urueta
Ignacio Álvarez

Men's 100m Breaststroke
Gustavo Lozano

Men's 200m Breaststroke
Gustavo Lozano

Men's 100m Butterfly
José Luis Prado

Men's 200m Butterfly
Ricardo Marmolejo

Men's 400m Individual Medley
Ricardo Marmolejo
Guillermo Zavala

Men's 4 × 200 m Freestyle Relay

Men's 4 × 100 m Medley Relay

Women's 100m Breaststroke
Beatriz Camuñas

Women's 200m Breaststroke
Beatriz Camuñas

Water polo

Men's team competition
Team roster
Alfred Schmidt
Arturo Valencia
Daniel Gómez
Francisco García
Javier Guerra
Jorge Coste
Juan García
Juan Yanez
Maximiliano Aguilar
Victorino Beristain
Armando Fernández

Weightlifting

Wrestling

References

Nations at the 1976 Summer Olympics
1976 Summer Olympics
Olympics